The 2000 UEFA Intertoto Cup finals were won by Udinese, Celta Vigo, and Stuttgart. All three teams advanced to the UEFA Cup.

First round
Matches played on 18–19 June and 25–26 June

First leg

The game was awarded to Dinaburg with a score of 3–0 due to OD Trenčín fielding an ineligible player.

The game was awarded to LASK Linz with a score of 3–0 due to Hapoel Petah Tikva fielding an ineligible player.

Second leg

Pelister won 4–1 on aggregate.

Dinaburg won 4–0 on aggregate.

Zagłębie Lubin won 7–1 on aggregate.

Cibalia won 4–2 on aggregate.

LASK Linz won 4–1 on aggregate.

Nea Salamis Famagusta won 6–2 on aggregate.

Tatabánya won 7–0 on aggregate.

6–6 on aggregate, Leiftur won on away goals rule.

Slaven Belupo won 4–1 on aggregate.

Dnepr-Transmash Mogilev won 4–2 on aggregate.

Stabæk won 3–1 on aggregate.

3–3 on aggregate, Standard Liège won on away goals rule.

Primorje won 11–0 on aggregate.

Ceahlăul Piatra Neamţ won 9–4 on aggregate.

Nistru Otaci won 2–0 on aggregate.

1–1 on aggregate, Atlantas won on penalties.

2–2 on aggregate, Västra Frölunda on away goals rule.

Neuchâtel Xamax won 5–4 on aggregate.

Sigma Olomouc won 3–1 on aggregate.

3–3 on aggregate, Velbazhd Kyustendil won on away goals rule.

Second round
Matches played 1–2 July and 8–9 July

First leg

Second leg

Austria Salzburg won 7–2 on aggregate.

Zenit Saint Petersburg won 6–1 on aggregate.

Standard Liège won 3–2 on aggregate.

Austria Wien won 3–1 on aggregate.

The game was awarded to Auxerre with a score of 3–0 due to Stabæk fielding an ineligible player Denis Iliohen. Auxerre won 5–0 on aggregate.

AaB won 1–0 on aggregate.

Marila Příbram won 4–3 on aggregate.

Bradford City won 7–2 on aggregate.

Ceahlăul Piatra Neamţ won 4–3 on aggregate.

Chmel Blšany won 8–2 on aggregate.

Sedan won 6–2 on aggregate.

Stuttgart won 10–2 on aggregate.

1–1 on aggregate, Slaven Belupo won on away goals rule.

Tatabánya won 3–2 on aggregate.

Pelister won 3–1 on aggregate.

Sigma Olomouc won 8–2 on aggregate.

Third round
Matches played 15–16 July and 22 July

First leg

Second leg

Celta Vigo won 5–1 on aggregate.

Udinese won 3–2 on aggregate.

Wolfsburg won 2–1 on aggregate.

Aston Villa won 3–1 on aggregate.

Chmel Blšany won 8–0 on aggregate.

2–2 on aggregate, Stuttgart won on away goals rule.

Bradford City won 3–0 on aggregate.

Auxerre won 5–1 on aggregate.

Sigma Olomouc won 3–1 on aggregate.

Standard Liège won 4–2 on aggregate.

Austria Wien won 5–2 on aggregate.

Zenit Saint Petersburg won 4–2 on aggregate.

Semi–finals
Matches played 26 July and 2 August

First leg

Second leg

Sigma Olomouc won 3–1 on aggregate.

Stuttgart won 2–1 on aggregate.

Zenit Saint Petersburg won 4–0 on aggregate.

Celta Vigo won 3–1 on aggregate.

Udinese won 3–0 on aggregate.

Auxerre won 3–2 on aggregate.

Finals
Matches played 8 & 22 August

First leg

Second leg

Celta Vigo won 4–3 on aggregate.

Stuttgart won 3–1 on aggregate.

Udinese won 6–4 on aggregate.

See also
2000–01 UEFA Champions League
2000–01 UEFA Cup

References

External links
Official website
Results at Rec.Sport.Soccer Statistics Foundation

UEFA Intertoto Cup
3